The 1951–52 Swedish Division I season was the eighth season of Swedish Division I. Sodertalje SK defeated Gavle GIK in the league final, 2 games to none.

Regular season

Northern Group

Southern Group

Final
Södertälje SK – Gävle GIK 4–1, 4–2

External links
 1951–52 season

1951–52 in Swedish ice hockey
Swedish Division I seasons
1951–52 in Swedish ice hockey leagues
Swedish